The Center for the Neurobiology of Learning and Memory (CNLM) is a research center established in 1983 in the School of Biological Sciences at the University of California, Irvine that studies memory and learning. Center faculty reported the first known case of hyperthymesia; they have also done research on false memory syndrome. James McGaugh was the founding director, and noted memory expert Elizabeth Loftus is a research fellow of the center.

Dr. Michael A. Yassa, professor of neurobiology and behavior, is the current director of the center.

See also
 Neurobiology
 Learning & Memory
James McGaugh

References

External links
 

University of California, Irvine
Multidisciplinary research institutes
Biological research institutes in the United States
Neuroscience research centers in California
Research institutes established in 1983
1983 establishments in California
Science and technology in Greater Los Angeles